Vediamoci chiaro (Let's See It Clear) is a 1984 Italian comedy film directed by Luciano Salce.

The author Enrico Giacovelli referred to the film as "a kind of Scent of a Woman but more ambiguous, midway between Luigi Pirandello's Henry IV and The Late Mattia Pascal".

Cast 

 Johnny Dorelli: Alberto Catuzzi 
 Eleonora Giorgi: Eleonora Bauer 
 Janet Agren: Geneviève 
 Giacomo Furia: Peppino 
 Angelo Infanti: Gianluca 
 Milly D'Abbraccio: Monique  
 Geoffrey Copleston: Mercalli

References

External links

1984 films
Italian comedy films
1984 comedy films
Films directed by Luciano Salce
Adultery in films
Films about blind people
Films set in Rome
1980s Italian films